Nymphula distinctalis is a moth in the family Crambidae. It was described by Ragonot in 1894. It is found in the Russian Far East and Japan.

References

Acentropinae
Moths described in 1894